Tatyana Nikolayevna Nikolayeva (25 December 1919 – 21 January 2022) was a Soviet and Russian politician.

She was First Secretary of the Ivanovo City Committee of the CPSU (1959) and Candidate member of the Central Committee of the Communist Party of the Soviet Union (1961–1971). Nikolayeva died on 21 January 2022, at the age of 102.

References

1919 births
2022 deaths
20th-century Russian women politicians
20th-century Russian politicians
21st-century Russian women politicians
People from Vladimir Governorate
Central Committee of the Communist Party of the Soviet Union members
Sixth convocation members of the Supreme Soviet of the Soviet Union
Seventh convocation members of the Supreme Soviet of the Soviet Union
Eighth convocation members of the Supreme Soviet of the Soviet Union
Recipients of the Order of Friendship of Peoples
Recipients of the Order of Lenin
Recipients of the Order of the Red Banner of Labour
Russian centenarians

Soviet women in politics
Women centenarians
21st-century Russian politicians